German submarine U-1024 was a Type VIIC/41 U-boat built for Nazi Germany's Kriegsmarine for service during World War II.
She was laid down on 20 May 1943 by Blohm & Voss, Hamburg as yard number 224, launched on 3 May 1944 and commissioned on 28 June 1944 under Kapitänleutnant Hans-Joachim Gutteck.

Design
Like all Type VIIC/41 U-boats, U-1024 had a displacement of  when at the surface and  while submerged.

U-1024 was fitted with five  torpedo tubes (four fitted at the bow and one at the stern), fourteen torpedoes or 26 TMA or TMB Naval mines, one  SK C/35 naval gun, (220 rounds), one  Flak M42 and two  C/30 anti-aircraft guns. Its complement was between forty-four and sixty.

Service history
The boat's service career began on 28 June 1944 with the 31st Training Flotilla, followed by active service with 11th Flotilla on 1 February 1945. U-1024 took part in no wolfpacks. There were 37 survivors.

Summary of raiding history

See also
 Battle of the Atlantic

References

Bibliography

German Type VIIC/41 submarines
U-boats commissioned in 1944
U-boats sunk in 1945
World War II submarines of Germany
1944 ships
World War II shipwrecks in the Irish Sea
Ships built in Hamburg
Maritime incidents in April 1945